This is a list of the tallest buildings in British Columbia that ranks skyscrapers and high-rise buildings in the province of British Columbia, Canada, by height. Buildings in six cities are included in this list; Vancouver, Burnaby, Coquitlam, New Westminster, Surrey, and Kelowna, each having buildings taller than 100 meters. The tallest building in the province is the 62-storey, Living Shangri-La located in Vancouver.

In Vancouver, municipal regulations forbid any building from exceeding 200 meters (656 ft) in height above mean sea level in order to preserve sight lines out toward the Pacific Ranges. The maximum limit is currently attained by Living Shangri-La. Despite this, Vancouver has more high-rise buildings per capita than most North American metropolitan centres with populations exceeding 1,000,000. Vancouver's population density is the 4th-highest in North America and the city has more residential high-rises per capita than any other city on the continent.

In Burnaby, municipal regulations do not limit building height, so long as the overall density of an area is within the city's limits.

In much of the region, the building style has led to most high rise development occurring around Skytrain stations, to create “transit hubs” and help to reduce urban sprawl. This has led to many suburbs building an urban core of their own, with residential, office, and commercial towers.

Tallest buildings
This list ranks buildings in British Columbia that stand at least 100 m (328 ft) tall, based on CTBUH height measurement standards. This includes spires and architectural details but does not include antenna masts. An equal sign (=) following a rank indicates the same height between two or more buildings.

* Indicates buildings that are still under construction but have been topped out.= Indicates buildings that have the same rank because they have the same height.

Tallest under construction or proposed

Under construction

Proposed

Tallest demolished

This table lists buildings in British Columbia that were demolished or destroyed and at one time stood at least  in height.

Timeline of tallest buildings
This is a list of buildings that in the past held the title of tallest building in British Columbia.

See also

 List of tallest buildings in Canada
 Canadian architecture
 Canadian Centre for Architecture
 Society of Architectural Historians

References
General
 
 
 
Specific

External links
 Diagram of Vancouver skyscrapers on SkyscraperPage

British Columbia
Tallest